Carl Ludwig David Friedrich Heusler (1 February 1866, Dillenburg – 25 October 1947) was a German mining engineer and chemist. He discovered a special group of intermetallics now known as Heusler phases, which are ferromagnetic though the constituting elements are not ferromagnetic.

Biography
He was born as son of Conrad Heusler the owner of the Isabellenhütte Dillenburg, a non-ferrous metal works. He studied at the  University of Bonn and University of Berlin and was awarded with his Ph.D in 1887 in Berlin. After working at the University of Göttingen he did his habilitation in Berlin 1894. In 1901 he discovered the ferromagnetic intermetallics, now known as Heusler phases,  and did some research in collaboration with the University of Marburg. Due to patent controversies it took until 1903 for the publication of the results. From 1902 he was head of the Isabellenhütte.

References
 F. Heusler: Verh. Deutsche Physikalische Gesellschaft 5 (1903), S. 219 ff.

100 Jahre „Heuslersche Legierungen“ from University of Marburg

1866 births
1947 deaths
People from Dillenburg
German mining engineers
19th-century German chemists
University of Bonn alumni
Engineers from Hesse
20th-century German chemists